, commonly known as a Sugi, is a Japanese footballer who plays as a winger for Persian Gulf Pro League club Foolad.

Club career

Early career and stint in Spain 
Sugi was born in Saitama, and joined Kashiwa Reysol's youth setup in 2009, aged 16. In the 2011 summer the Spanish agent Javier Subirats decided to represent him, after a friendly match between Kashiwa and Elche CF's reserves.

However, after failing to join the Valencians, Sugi returned to Japan to play for Sendai University until October 2012, when Gaspar Campillo, coach and sporting director of FC Jove Español San Vicente, decided to sign him after positive reports written by Subirats. He signed an 18-month deal with the Valencian side, but due to bureaucratic problems, was unable to play with the main squad in the Tercera División, and was assigned to the B-team in the regional levels.

After Jove Español's assignment as a farm team of Hércules CF, Sugi was called up to the latter's first team by manager Quique Hernández. He played his first match as a professional on 11 September 2013, replacing Quique de Lucas in the 56th minute of a 2–0 home win against Real Murcia in the season's Copa del Rey, becoming the first Asian to play for Hércules.

Sugi made his league debut on 17 November 2013, again from the bench in a 2–4 loss at Córdoba CF in the Segunda División, and scored his first professional goal seven days later, netting the last of a 3–0 home success against CE Sabadell. On 22 December 2013, he renewed his link with the Valencian side, signing a three-and-a-half-year contract with a €10 million release clause, being definitely promoted to the main squad.

Thailand 
He left Hércules in 2015, moving to Thailand playing for Pattaya United and PTT Rayong.

Dalkurd FF 
On 21 February 2017, Sugita signed a two-year deal with Dalkurd FF in Superettan, Sweden's second tier. Dalkurd won a promotion to Allsvenskan the same season.

In 2018, Sugita established himself as a key player at Dalkurd, although the club struggled in the league and was placed at the foot of the table mid through the season.

Tractor S.C.
On 29 July 2018, Sugita signed a three-year contract with Tractor in the Iran Pro League.

IK Sirius 
In March 2020 he joined the Swedish Allsvenskan team IK Sirius on a short-term loan. On 22 July 2020, the loan was extended 31 August. The loan extension was made after the Persian Gulf Pro League was delayed until late September.

References

External links
 
 

1993 births
Living people
Sportspeople from Saitama (city)
Association football people from Saitama Prefecture
Japanese footballers
Association football wingers
Dalkurd FF players
Hércules CF players
Tractor S.C. players
Segunda División players
Tercera División players
Allsvenskan players
Persian Gulf Pro League players
Japanese expatriate footballers
Expatriate footballers in Spain
Expatriate footballers in Sweden
Expatriate footballers in Iran
Japanese expatriate sportspeople in Spain
Segunda División B players